Tere Dil Vich Rehan De ( "Let me stay in your heart") is a 2021 Indian Punjabi drama television series. It premiered on 22 November 2021 on Zee Punjabi. It is directed by Rakesh Vyas of Zee Studios Ltd. and stars Vandana Singh and Robin Sohi in the lead roles. It is an official remake of Zee Telugu TV series America Ammayi. Its timeslot was 6:30 pm and its repeat timeslot was 9:00 pm. It was one of the top rated shows of Zee Punjabi. It replaced Tedha Medha Sadda Vedha. It ended on 22 April 2022.

Plot 
Tere Dil Vich Rehan De is a story about a girl, Simart, who was born and brought up in Canada and values Indian traditions and culture. Her mother, Gurleen, was disowned by her parents after she chose to marry a Canadian, Chris, against their wishes.

Gurleen falls ill and wishes to reunite with her family. Simrat takes it upon herself to bring the family together. Simrat tries to fill the gap between her mother, Gurleen and her maternal family, but faces various challenges. She moves in her grandparents' home with a disguised identity. During the course of her stay, she falls in love with her maternal uncle's son, Pukhraj. Her many adventures also include helping her cousin, Preet, marry her loved one, Amreek. After Preet's marriage, Pukhraj and Sam become engaged. Simrat's covert plan is soon exposed.Pukhraj got angry about Sam, Simrat and learn about Sam's mother and Father is Gurleen and Chris. Pukhraj burn Sam's bag and clothes.

Cast

Main 
 Vandana Singh as Simrat Williams Walia aka Sam, Chris and Gurleen's daughter, Pukhraj's cousin and love interest. (2021-2022)
 Robin Sohi as Pukhraj Walia, Gurbash and Baani's son, Maahi's real brother, Simrat's cousin and love interest. (2021-2022)
 Balwinder Kaur Bhagowal as Navjot Walia aka Biji, Gurleen's mother, Simrat's grandmother. (2021-2022)
 Hardeep Kaur Khalsa as Gurleen Walia Williams, Chris's wife, Simrat's mother, Navjot and Jagjit's middle class daughter, Preet, Maahi, Pukhraj and Amandeep's aunty. (2021-2022)

Recurring 
 Ramnik Amandeep Sharma as Harpreet Walia Sharma, Mahinder's wife, Navjot Kaur and Jagjit Singh's oldest daughter, Simrat, Pukhraj, Maahi, Preet and Amandeep's aunty, Gurbash, Paramjeet and Gurleen's elder sister. (2022)
 Gavie Luthra as Mahinder Sharma as Villain, Harpreet's husband, Navjot Walia and Jagjit Walia's son in law, Simrat, Pukhraj,Maahi, Preet and Amandeep's uncle, Gurbash, Paramjeet and Gurleen 's brother in law, who murdered his father in law Jagjit Walia and wanted to marry  Gurleen. (2022)
 Jassi Saggu as Gurbash Walia, Navjot Walia and Jagjit Walia's oldest son, Preet and Amandeep's uncle, Pukhraj and Maahi's father, Baani's husband, Harpreet, Paramjeet and Gurleen's first elder brother, Simrat's uncle and  later became father in law. (2021-2022)   
 Manu Dhanjal as Baani Walia, Maahi and Pukhraj's mother, Gurbash's wife, Gurleen's sister in law, Navjot and Jagjit's daughter in law, Sam's aunty and later became mother in law. (2021-2022)
 Himanshu Gandhi as Amandeep Walia, Lovely and Param's son, Preet's real brother. (2021-2022)
 Guneet Sharma as Amreek, Preet's love interest. (2021-2022)
 Preeti Arora Jain as Amreek's mother, Preet's mother in law. (2021-2022)
 Preety Pari as Lovely Walia, Amandeep and Preet's mother, Navjot and Jagjit's second daughter in law, Param's wife, Gurleen's sister in law. (2021-2022)
 Sunny Prabhakar as Paramjit Walia, Amandeep and Preet's father, Navjot and Jagjit's second son, Lovely's husband, Harpreet,  Gurleen's second real brother, Gurbash's younger brother. (2021-2022)
 Rajbeer Singh Sidhu as Unknown, Manoj's fake mother, who was becoming Preet's fake mother in law and but plan failed, suddenly arrested to Unknown and Manoj by police because Sam reveals Manoj killed his mother, he will marry to Preet and ruin her life and kill Preet,he will go to Canada with his fake mother and Preet to kill both. (2022)

Adaptations

References

External links 
 
 Tere Dil Vich Rehan De at ZEE5

Zee Punjabi original programming
2021 Indian television series debuts
Punjabi-language television shows
2022 Indian television series endings